Lendy Holmes (born October 26, 1985) is a former professional football player. 

Holms grew up in Dallas, Texas and graduated from South Oak Cliff High School, where he played defensive back for the football team.

A four star recruit who was rated the 16th best high school football player in Texas, Holmes played college football for the Oklahoma Sooners.

Undrafted by the NFL out of college,    Holmes played defensive back for the Texas Revolution of Champions Indoor Football (CIF) in 2009.

References

External links
Just Sports Stats
Washington Redskins bio

1985 births
Living people
People from Dallas
Players of American football from Texas
American football safeties
Oklahoma Sooners football players
Washington Redskins players
Sacramento Mountain Lions players
Tampa Bay Storm players
Texas Revolution players